The Yellow Birds is a 2017 American war film directed by Alexandre Moors and based on the novel The Yellow Birds by Kevin Powers. The film stars Tye Sheridan, Alden Ehrenreich, Toni Collette, Jason Patric, Jack Huston and Jennifer Aniston.

The story is about two young U.S. soldiers who navigate the terrors of the Iraq War. When only one of the soldiers returns home, he is tortured by a promise he made to the other's mother before their deployment. The film had its world premiere at the Sundance Film Festival on January 21, 2017. It was released on May 17, 2018, through DirecTV Cinema before being released in a limited release and through video on demand on June 15, 2018, by Saban Films.

Plot
The story alternates between flashbacks of U.S. soldier John Bartle's time serving in Iraq with his friend Daniel "Murph" Murphy, and Bartle returning to his home in Richmond, Virginia. Only Bartle has come back, leaving the fate of Murph a mystery. Bartle first meets Murph during basic training, with Murph noting both men are from Virginia. While Murph is a middle-class kid who wants to attend the University of Virginia after his service, Bartle is from a working-class background and has no idea what he wants to do with his life. Despite their differences, the two soldiers form a friendship. At a party before the men ship off to Iraq, Bartle meets Murph’s mom Maureen, who makes him promise that if anything happens to her son, he’ll bring her the news personally.

In Iraq, the two soldiers are placed under the command of the older, troubled Sergeant Sterling. Murph is gradually broken down by the horrors of the experience. When Murph is injured, he is tended to by a female medic named Jenny whom he develops an attraction to. He watches Jenny from a distance every day as she tends to patients, but does not have the courage to approach her. One day, Murph observes Jenny as she arrives at her post, but she is visibly distraught. Suddenly, the area is hit by bombs. In the ensuing chaos, Murph finds Jenny, but she is fatally wounded. He and Bartle lift Jenny’s body onto a beam for burial.

In the present, Bartle suffers from PTSD and has a combative relationship with his mother Amy. After a fight with his mom, he gets out of the house and wanders aimlessly around town. Out in the woods, he spies a young couple kissing and starts walking towards them, wading through the deep river where he becomes submerged and nearly drowns. The couple notices and calls the police. Meanwhile, Maureen locates where Bartle lives and goes to his home in the hopes of inquiring about her son; she is greeted by Amy who invites her in. Bartle, after being let go by the police, is apprehended by CID officer Captain Anderson, who informs him he has been investigating Murph’s disappearance. Anderson discloses to Bartle the news that Sterling has committed suicide.

Bartle is put in prison where he calls his mom and apologizes to her for his actions. He is visited by Maureen, who wants him to tell the truth about what happened to her son. Bartle recounts that while the soldiers were doing a sweep of an Iraqi village, Murph wandered off from the unit and disappeared. In search of Murph, Bartle and Sterling are led to a minaret by an elderly hermit, where they find Murph's dead body, naked and nearly castrated, dumped behind a bush. Bartle, believing Murph’s mother would not want to see her son’s body in such a state, resolves with Sterling to get rid of the body in a river. As he releases his friend's body in the water, Bartle remarks that Murph always wanted to disappear and that this is the way he would have wanted to go. Sterling insists this must be kept a secret, before shooting the hermit to Bartle’s surprise. After learning the truth, Maureen tearfully asks Bartle if there were any moments when her son was happy. Bartle says there was, and recounts a holiday party on base where Murph wanted to dance with Jenny but was too nervous to ask her. Jenny noticed Murphy and approaches him, asking him to dance. The film ends with Murph and Jenny locked in a slow dance.

Cast

Production
David Lowery first adapted the book into a screenplay and was originally tapped to direct, but had to drop out because of a scheduling conflict with Pete's Dragon. Once Alexandre Moors replaced Lowery as director, Moors' Blue Caprice screenwriter R.F.I. Porto was brought on to revise the script. Benedict Cumberbatch and Will Poulter were originally cast but they dropped out after the project was delayed and were replaced by Jack Huston and Alden Ehrenreich, respectively. Jennifer Aniston served as an executive producer. The title song was written by John Mellencamp.

Principal photography on the film began in October 2015 in Morocco, and it wrapped on January 29, 2016.

Release
The film had its world premiere at the Sundance Film Festival on January 21, 2017. Shortly after, Saban Films and DirecTV Cinema acquired U.S. distribution rights to the film. It was released on May 17, 2018, through DirecTV Cinema before being released in a limited release and through video on demand on June 15, 2018.

Reception
On review aggregator Rotten Tomatoes, the film holds an approval rating of 44% based on 41 reviews, with a weighted average rating of 5.3/10. The website's critical consensus reads, "The Yellow Birds has a strong cast and a worthy message, but they're both lost in this war drama's rote, clichéd story." On Metacritic, the film has a weighted average score of 56 out of 100, based on 15 critics, indicating "mixed or average reviews".

Jeannette Catsoulis of The New York Times wrote the film is "a thoughtful, melancholy drama whose performances and photography are so strong that we keep waiting for the story to catch up. Watch it once, and you could come away a little underwhelmed; watch it twice, and you begin to suspect that its almost humdrum rhythms are exactly the point."

The performances of Ehrenreich and Sheridan were praised. Michael Rechtshaffen of the Los Angeles Times wrote, "Making a late appearance in the Iraq War movie cycle, the impressively acted 'The Yellow Birds' manages to leave an affecting mark even as it constantly struggles to find a distinctive voice of its own." Rechtshaffen also commended Aniston and Collette for their "uniformly naturalistic performances."

Writing for RogerEbert.com, Brian Tallerico criticized the film for borrowing elements from other war films like The Hurt Locker and Full Metal Jacket, but praised Daniel Landin's cinematography and Ehrenreich's acting.

Accolades

References

External links 
 
 

2017 films
2017 independent films
Films shot in Morocco
Iraq War films
American war drama films
Films about the United States Army
Films about veterans
2017 war drama films
Films based on American novels
Cinelou Films films
Echo Films films
Saban Films films
2017 drama films
Films about post-traumatic stress disorder
Films about mother–son relationships
2010s American films